George Allen "Iron" Davis Jr. (March 9, 1890 – June 4, 1961) was an American professional baseball pitcher. He played all or part of four seasons in Major League Baseball from 1912 to 1915. He played for the Boston Braves and New York Highlanders.

College
When Davis arrived at Williams College, he had never played baseball and he did not seem athletic enough for it. "His strength was confined to his brains and he had the physique of an Oliver Twist," wrote Ring Lardner. Davis neglected his studies in his freshman year because he was working out in the gymnasium and teaching himself to throw a baseball. When Williams coach Billy Lauder saw Davis in the gym one day, he allowed Davis to join the baseball team. He received attention from several major league scouts, and he signed with the New York Highlanders in 1912.

Major league career
Davis pursued studies at Harvard Law School while he was a major league pitcher. He won only seven career major league games, but one of those games was a no-hitter; he threw the no-hit game for the Boston Braves on September 9, 1914, against the Philadelphia Phillies.

From 1918 to 1919, Davis served in the U.S. Army. After his military service, he settled in Buffalo, New York and took philosophy, comparative religion and astronomy classes at University at Buffalo. For thirty years he conducted astronomy classes at the Buffalo Museum of Science, where he was also a trustee.

Davis was married to Georgiana "Kiddo" Jones, and they had four children. One of Kiddo's granddaughters said that she had been a suffragette and "the first in her circle to raise her skirts above the ankle."

Political career
From 1928 to 1934, Davis was a member-at-large of the Buffalo Common Council, and sought the Republican nomination for mayor in 1934 unsuccessfully. He practiced law under a family firm before joining what would become Hodgson Russ law firm.

Death
Davis hanged himself in Buffalo, New York on June 4, 1961.

See also
List of Major League Baseball no-hitters

References

External links

1890 births
1961 suicides
Major League Baseball pitchers
New York Highlanders players
Boston Braves players
Providence Grays (minor league) players
Williams Ephs baseball players
Harvard Law School alumni
Buffalo Common Council members
New York (state) Republicans
Baseball players from Buffalo, New York
Suicides by hanging in New York (state)
People from Lancaster, New York
20th-century American politicians
United States Army personnel of World War I